John A. Latsch State Park is a  state park of Minnesota, USA, on the Mississippi River,  northwest of Winona. The park is nearly undeveloped, with a small walk-in campground (closed to use currently) and only one trail. It functions primarily as a wayside on U.S. Route 61, which runs between the river and the base of the bluffs. Lock and Dam No. 5 is adjacent to the park.

Natural history
The park sits on limestone laid down on the floor of a shallow sea 500 million years ago.  Torrents of runoff at the end of the Wisconsin glaciation 10,000 years ago carved the bed of the Mississippi River down into this limestone, leaving high bluffs along its banks.  The park is situated in the Driftless Area, an atypically rugged region of the Upper Midwest because it was never glaciated and covered with a layer of glacial till, or drift.

Flora and fauna
The steepness of the three bluffs deterred logging, and the forest cover today is a high quality mix of many different species.  These include several kinds of oak, maple, elm, cedar, and ash, as well as black walnut, hickory, basswood, ironwood, birch, and poplar.
A great variety of birds migrate past the park along the Mississippi Flyway. Terrestrial species include white-tailed deer, coyotes, red foxes, opossums, and timber rattlesnakes.

Cultural history 
The three bluffs were named by steamboat captains, who used them as landmarks.  A logging town with its own steamboat landing was active here in the 1850s, supplying lumber to sawmills in newly founded Winona.  The townsite has since been submerged by water backed up by the lock and dam.

John A. Latsch was a Winona businessman who loved fishing beneath these three bluffs.  He purchased some of the property and, along with an adjacent landowner, donated  for a state park in 1925.  Latsch was a lifelong patron of conservation; Whitewater State Park and Wisconsin's Perrot State Park both grew out of other parcels he donated.  He was also a founder of the Izaak Walton League, an early environmental non-profit organization.

Development at this park stagnated, largely because the only level land was at the mouths of the small ravines that separated the three bluffs.  The Civilian Conservation Corps blazed a trail to the top of Mount Charity, the highest of the trio, in 1933.  Latsch, who died the following year, recorded his regret that he hadn't acquired more property in the beginning.  In 1963 the Minnesota Legislature authorized an extension of the park's boundaries, to include a sizeable area behind the bluffs.  However this property is yet to be acquired from its private owners, and the publicly held land in the park amounts to only .  A 1971 analysis recommended that John A. Latsch State Park be reclassified as a Scientific and Natural Area, though this has not been acted upon either.

Recreation
The park features a picnic ground and 7 primitive walk-in campsites (which are currently closed to the public).  Water is available seasonally from a pump.  The only trail is the steep,  Riverview Trail, which climbs  to the top of Mount Charity, offering a panoramic view of the Mississippi River Valley.

References

Arthur, Anne.  Minnesota's State Parks.  Adventure Publications, Inc.: Cambridge, MN, 1998.
Bewer, Tim.  Moon Handbooks: Minnesota.  Avalon Travel Publishing: Emeryville, CA, 2004.
Meyer, Roy W.  Everyone's Country Estate: A History of Minnesota's State Parks.  Minnesota Historical Society Press: St. Paul, 1991.  
Minnesota Department of Natural Resources. 2006. The Minnesota Department of Natural Resources Web Site (online).

External links

John A. Latsch State Park

1925 establishments in Minnesota
Civilian Conservation Corps in Minnesota
Driftless Area
Protected areas established in 1925
Protected areas of Winona County, Minnesota
Protected areas on the Mississippi River
State parks of Minnesota